Ibalon, or Ibalong, is the ancient name of the Bicol Region in the Philippines.  The center of settlement is believed to be either beside the Bicol River at the present-day Libmanan, Camarines Sur (as based on the Ibalong Epic) or in Magallanes, Sorsogon, Philippines, renowned as one of the first Spanish settlement in the island of Luzon. At some point, the name Ibalong was also been used by the Spanish to refer to the entire Bicol Peninsula, and to some extent the entire island of Luzon.

The Epic of Ibalong, at the present times, is being celebrated by Legazpi City in Albay. The Ibalong Festival celebrates the epic story of the Kingdom of Ibalong with three legendary heroes, namely Baltog, Handyong, Bantong and other ancient heroes. People parade in the streets wearing masks and costumes to imitate the appearances of the heroes and the villains, portraying the classic battles that made their way into the history of Bicol. The Ibalong Festival aims to express warmth and goodwill to all people; visitors and tourists are encouraged to celebrate with the Bicolanos.

See also 

 Bicol Region
 Ibalong Epic
 Ibalong Festival

References

History of Sorsogon
History of the Philippines (900–1565)